Hucqueliers is a commune in the department of Pas-de-Calais, in the northern French region of Hauts-de-France.

Geography
Situated some 10 miles (16 km) northeast of Montreuil-sur-Mer at the D148 and D128 crossroads.

Population

History
An important castle was built here in 1231 by the Count of Boulogne.
Hucqueliers was the centre of resistance during the Lustucru revolt in 1662.

Places of interest
 The chateau, now an educational establishment.
 The church of St. André, dating from the fifteenth century.
 The eighteenth century Manoir de la Longeville.

See also
Communes of the Pas-de-Calais department

References

External links

 Official Hucqueliers Site 

Communes of Pas-de-Calais